is a Japanese department store chain owned by Tokyu Group.

Stores

Japan
Kichijoji
Tama Plaza
Sapporo

Closed Branches
Shibuya Toyoko (Shibuya Station), closed down on March 31, 2020.
Shibuya Honten (flagship store), closed down on January 31, 2023.

Closed Branches outside Japan

Thailand
 Inside MBK Center, the first store opened in 1985. Closed down on January 31, 2021.
 Inside Paradise Park, opened on June 19, 2015. Closed down on January 31, 2019.

See also 
Shirokiya

References

External links 
 

Department Store
Department stores of Japan
Defunct department stores of Thailand
Companies formerly listed on the Tokyo Stock Exchange